Abakumlevo is a rural locality (a selo) in Seletskoye Rural Settlement of Suzdalsky District, Vladimir Oblast, Russia. The population was 13 as of 2010. There are 3 streets.

Geography 
Abakumlevo is located 10 km east of Suzdal (the district's administrative centre) by road. Novoselka Nerlskaya is the nearest rural locality.

References 

Rural localities in Suzdalsky District
Vladimirsky Uyezd